Khaled Badra (born 8 April 1973) is a Tunisian former professional footballer who played as a defender.

Club career
Badra was born in Kairouan. After beginnings with his hometown's squad, Jeunesse Sportive Kairouanaise, he joined Espérance de Tunis in 1996. He made a name for himself in the country as a powerful and uncompromising centre-back, who could also score from set pieces. He earned a call up to the Tunisian national football team for the 1996 Olympics in Atlanta at the age of 23 and became a virtual ever-present after that. His good form for the national side was mirrored in Tunisian competitions, where he has led Espérance to continuous league triumphs.

His club football career has been varied – solid and loyal service interspersed by short spells abroad. He also played for Genoa C.F.C. in Seria B, Al-Ahli Jeddah in Saudi Premier League, and Denizlispor in the Turkish league. He plans to see out his career at Espérance.

International career
Badra featured for the Tunisia national team in both 1998 World Cup and 2002 World Cup, as well as the three African Nations Cups in that time. His finest hour came in the 2004 African Nations Cup when Tunisia hosted the games. He scored two penalties in the semi final against Nigeria (one in normal time and another in the shootout), but also picked up a yellow card meaning he was suspended for the final. He decided to retire from international football in 2006.

International goals
Scores and results list Tunisia's goal tally first, score column indicates score after each Badra goal.

Honours
Espérance Sportive de Tunis
Tunisian League: 1998, 1999, 2000, 2003, 2004, 2006
Tunisian President Cup: 1997, 1999
African Cup Winners' Cup: 1998
CAF Cup: 1997
African Cup Winners' Cup: 1998

Al-Ahli (Jeddah)
Crown Prince Cup: 2002, 2007
Arab Champions League: 2003
Saudi Federation cup: 2007

Tunisia
 Africa Cup of Nations: 2004

References

External links

Living people
1973 births
People from Kairouan
Tunisian footballers
Association football defenders
Tunisia international footballers
1996 African Cup of Nations players
1998 African Cup of Nations players
2000 African Cup of Nations players
2002 African Cup of Nations players
2004 African Cup of Nations players
Footballers at the 1996 Summer Olympics
Olympic footballers of Tunisia
1998 FIFA World Cup players
2002 FIFA World Cup players
Tunisian Ligue Professionnelle 1 players
Serie B players
Süper Lig players
Saudi Professional League players
Qatar Stars League players
JS Kairouan players
Espérance Sportive de Tunis players
Denizlispor footballers
Genoa C.F.C. players
Al-Ahli Saudi FC players
Al Kharaitiyat SC players
Tunisian expatriate footballers
Tunisian expatriate sportspeople in Saudi Arabia
Expatriate footballers in Saudi Arabia